The Two The Hard Way Tour (also known as Allman and Woman Tour) was a concert tour by the American singer-actress Cher and the American singer Gregg Allman, designed to promote their joint Two the Hard Way album. Because of the album's commercial failure, the dates of the tour in the United States were very limited, although there were more dates in Japan, Oceania and Europe.

History
At the time of the tour, Cher had just finished production of The Sonny & Cher Show after a broken six-year run. Allman's band, The Allman Brothers Band, was in the middle of an acrimonious break up.

The European leg of the tour covered the Netherlands, Belgium, France, UK and West Germany, over a period of 29 days. The tour started on November 6, 1977, and was to be a 29 date tour, but on December 3, 1977, Cher left the tour and left Allman in Europe while she returned to the United States with her children. Two nights in Sydney, Melbourne, Brisbane, Adelaide and Perth were planned but never went through.

The pair were backed by an eight-piece band. The show, whose material was selected by both of them, combined Allman's material, which he sang solo, and numerous duets between the two on softer material in a blues or country and western vein. Cher avoided the gaudy, over-the-top outfits of her normal stage self, and instead wore jeans, a tank top and a cowboy hat. They also engaged in some married-couple stage banter, although not to the Sonny and Cher level.

In November 1977, following their opening show in Brussels, Belgium, Allman said that he had had some concerns about the endeavor. "It's the first time ever we've given concerts together. We wondered a lot about how it would work out. For one thing, we didn't know if we'd be accepted." Cher said, "It's different, but not that different, and I also find it real easy to sing this type of music," sentiments she had said before the tour as well. "We sound like we've been singing together for a long time."

Allman did not want this tour's road expenses to mount up, as they had for the last Allman Brothers Band tour. However, this tour too lost money from the start. The Hard Way Tour also led to the final break up of the couple. While pre-tour publicity had emphasized that Allman was free from drug and alcohol problems, Cher discovered during it that his drinking had returned and, once the tour was complete, she told him that their marriage was finally over.

Partial set list
The set list included:

"Matthew's Arrival"
"Trouble No More"
"Don't Keep Me Wonderin'"
"Queen of Hearts"
"Let This Be a Lesson to Ya"
"Sweet Feelin'"
"One More Try"
"Oncoming Traffic"
"Come and Go Blues"
"Bring It On Back"
"Leave My Blues at Home"
"Whipping Post"
"Move Me" (with Cher)
"Do What You Gotta Do" (with Cher)
"Midnight Rider"

Also included in the setlist at various stages of the tour:
"You've Really Got a Hold on Me" (with Cher)
"Love the One You're With" (with Cher)
"Love Me" (with Cher)
"Half-Breed" (Acoustic Version) Cher solo (with Allman at the guitar)

Tour dates

Cancelled shows

Personnel
 Gregg Allman - organ and vocals
 Cher - vocals
 Neil Larsen - piano
 Ricky Hirsch - guitar
 John Hug - guitar
 Kenny Burke - bass guitar
 Bill Stewart - drums
 Gene Dinwiddie - saxophone

Broadcasts and recordings
Concerts were only recorded in Oceania and Japan. Video or photographic records of these concerts are very hard to come by, but in early 2008, three low quality videos emerged on YouTube from the Japanese concerts. Cher is in only one video, but in Japan she also sings "You've Really Got a Hold On Me".

The couple were guests on the UK television show The Old Grey Whistle Test in 1977 to promote the album and tour, clips of which can be seen in the documentaries Still Cher and A&E Biography. In October 2021, Cher released high quality videos of several live performances from The Old Grey Whistle Test on her YouTube channel.

References

Cher concert tours
1977 concert tours